Abacetus mateui is a species of ground beetle in the subfamily Pterostichinae. It was described by Straneo in 1959 and is found in Equatorial Guinea, Africa.

References

mateui
Beetles described in 1959